The highfin snake eel (Ophichthus altipennis, also known as the blackfin snake eel or the black-finned snake eel, is an eel in the family Ophichthidae. It was described by Johann Jakob Kaup in 1856, originally under the genus Microdonophis. It is a marine, tropical eel known from the eastern Indian Ocean and northwestern and western central Pacific Ocean, including Australia, French Polynesia, Indonesia, Japan, the Marshall Islands, Malaysia, the Philippines, and Papua New Guinea.

Due to its wide distribution in the Pacific and lack of known threats, the IUCN redlist currently lists the highfin snake eel as "Least Concern".

References

External links
 

highfin snake eel
highfin snake eel
Taxa named by Johann Jakob Kaup